Agylla beema is a moth of the family Erebidae. It was described by Frederic Moore in 1866. It is found in Sikkim, India.

References

Moths described in 1866
beema
Moths of Asia